Lawrence Carter (baptised 30 September 1668 – 14 March 1745) of Leicester, was an English judge and politician, a baron of the Court of Exchequer (1726-1745).

He was born in September 1671, the eldest son of Lawrence Carter and Elizabeth Wadland.

He died on 14 March 1745, aged 69, and was buried at the church of St Mary de Castro, Leicester.

References

 

1668 births
1745 deaths
English MPs 1698–1700
English MPs 1701–1702
British MPs 1710–1713
British MPs 1713–1715
British MPs 1715–1722
British MPs 1722–1727
Politicians from Leicester
17th-century English politicians
18th-century English politicians
Members of the Parliament of Great Britain for Bere Alston